Martorell is a town near Barcelona, Catalonia, Spain.

Martorell may also refer to:

 Martorell (surname)
 FS Martorell, futsal club based in Martorell, Spain
 Martorell's ulcer, a painful ulceration of the lower leg associated with diastolic arterial hypertension